West Branch Township may refer to the following places in the U.S. state of Michigan:

 West Branch Township, Dickinson County, Michigan
 West Branch Township, Marquette County, Michigan
 West Branch Township, Missaukee County, Michigan
 West Branch Township, Ogemaw County, Michigan

See also 
 West Branch, Michigan, a city in Ogemaw County
 West Branch Township (disambiguation)

Michigan township disambiguation pages